William Henry Dean Jr. (1910-1952) was an American economic geographer. He was the second African American  to gain a PhD in economics from Harvard University. His 1938 doctoral dissertation applied results from mathematics and astronomy to location theory in economic geography.

Works
 The theory of the geographic location of economic activities, with special reference to historical change. PhD thesis, Harvard University, 1938.

References

1910 births
1952 deaths
American geographers
Economic geographers
American economists
African-American economists
Harvard Graduate School of Arts and Sciences alumni